Kushk-e Bidak (also Romanized as Kūshk-e Bīdak and Kūshk Bīdak; also known as Kooshké Bidak and Kūshk-e Bīd, and) is a village in Qarah Bagh Rural District, in the Central District of Shiraz County, Fars Province, Iran. At the 2006 census, its population was 3,016, in 770 families.

References 

Populated places in Shiraz County